Errol Denis Mann (June 27, 1941 – April 11, 2013) was an American football placekicker. He played in the National Football League from 1968 to 1978, and was a member of the Oakland Raiders' Super Bowl XI winning team. When attempting kicks, Mann used the straight-on style, which was the standard method at the time. This style of kicking later fell into disuse with the advent of soccer/association football-style place-kicking in the 1970s. The straight-on method is almost never used by American football placekickers now.

Professional career 
Born in Campbell, Minnesota, Mann began his career by playing for teams located in the Upper Midwest such as the Green Bay Packers before transferring to the Detroit Lions in the next year. In 1970, Mann led the NFL in extra points attempted and extra points scored, being a perfect 41 out of 41 on extra points. In 1976, he played for both the Lions and the Oakland Raiders, but made only 8 of 22 field goals in the regular season. When the Raiders appeared in Super Bowl XI, Mann made two field goals, including one from 40 yards, to help the Raiders become Super Bowl Champions for the first time in the history of their franchise.  However, he also missed a 29-yard field goal and two extra point attempts. The following season, 1977, was arguably the best season of his career, leading the NFL in extra points attempted with 42, extra points made with 39 and he also led the NFL in points scored with 99. Mann left the NFL after playing for the Raiders in the 1978 season.

References

1941 births
2013 deaths
American football placekickers
Detroit Lions players
Green Bay Packers players
Oakland Raiders players
North Dakota Fighting Hawks football players
People from Breckenridge, Minnesota